Hamish Bennett is a New Zealand filmmaker.

Early life and education

Bennett is of Māori descent, of the Ngāti Whakaue, Patuharakeke and Kati Waewae peoples. He grew up in a small rural town in Northland.

He earned a BA at Massey University in 1998, majoring in English and Media Studies at the Manawatū. His elder brother,  Simon, is a psychology lecturer at the university.
 he was working full-time as a school teacher.

Career

Bennett's first short film, The Dump (2012), won Best Short Script at the NZ Writers Guild Awards in 2012.

Hi second short film, Ross & Beth (2014), won many awards, including the Jury and Audience prizes at the 2014 New Zealand International Film Festival.

His first feature film, Bellbird, had its world premiere at the Sydney Film Festival in 2019, won an audience award at the Melbourne International Film Festival and screened in the New Zealand International Film Festival as well as other international film festivals. It screened at Palmerston North on 20 October 2019, as a preview before its nationwide release on 7 November, screening at 70 cinemas around the country.

Bennett's film won the Jury Grand Prix at the 2021 Antipodean Film Festival in Saint Tropez, France.

References

External links

New Zealand film directors